Carla Rebecca Lockhart (born 28 February 1985) is a Democratic Unionist Party (DUP) politician, who has been the Member of Parliament (MP) for Upper Bann since the 2019 general election. She was previously a Member of the Northern Ireland Assembly for Upper Bann, elected at the 2016 election, until 2019.

Early life and career

Lockhart was born to Kenneth and Valerie Lockhart in Aughnacloy, County Tyrone, as part of a working-class family. She attended Aughnacloy High School, before attending Armagh Tech (now part of Southern Regional College) and then obtaining a business degree from the University of Ulster. Interested in politics from a young age, she was a member of the DUP's Young Democrats in her youth.

Political career

Lockhart was elected to Craigavon Borough Council in 2007, representing the Lurgan area. She was Mayor of Craigavon from 2012 to 2013, and stepped down in 2016 to run for the Assembly elections. Lockhart was President of the Local Government Association of Northern Ireland from 2015 to 2016.

She worked full-time in the Lurgan DUP Advice Centre under Stephen Moutray, whilst working as a councillor. Lockhart was elected as an MLA for Upper Bann in 2016.

On 8 November 2019, Lockhart announced her candidacy for the Upper Bann Westminster constituency at the 2019 general election. On 13 December, Lockhart won the seat in Westminster, succeeding the retiring MP David Simpson, and stepped down from her seat as MLA for Upper Bann.

Lockhart is a governor at Lurgan Junior High School and Magheralin Primary School.

In December 2022, Lockhart, Miriam Cates and Rosie Duffield signed a cross-party letter asking the British Government to block the Scottish Government's Gender Recognition Reform (Scotland) Bill.

Personal life
Lockhart is a member of the Free Presbyterian Church of Ulster. She is married to Rodney Condell, a quantity surveyor.

References

External links 
 
 Northern Ireland Assembly biography
Appearances on C-SPAN
 Facebook
 Twitter

Living people
UK MPs 2019–present
Politicians from County Tyrone
Alumni of Ulster University
Democratic Unionist Party MLAs
Democratic Unionist Party MPs
Northern Ireland MLAs 2016–2017
Northern Ireland MLAs 2017–2022
Female members of the Northern Ireland Assembly
Female members of the Parliament of the United Kingdom for Northern Irish constituencies
Mayors of Craigavon
Members of Craigavon Borough Council
Members of the Parliament of the United Kingdom for Upper Bann
People from Craigavon, County Armagh
Presbyterians from Northern Ireland
Women mayors of places in Northern Ireland
21st-century women politicians from Northern Ireland
1985 births
Women councillors in Northern Ireland